Andris Smirnovs (born 6 February 1990) is a Latvian former professional cyclist.

Major results

2010
 3rd Riga Grand Prix
2011
 1st Central European Tour Budapest GP
 1st Kernen Omloop Echt-Susteren
 7th Scandinavian Race Uppsala
 8th Overall Carpathia Couriers Paths
 8th Ronde van Vlaanderen U23
 8th Mayor Cup
 10th Road race, UCI Under-23 Road World Championships
2012
 1st GP Oued Eddahab, Les Challenges de la Marche Verte
 3rd Time trial, National Under-23 Road Championships
 4th Circuit d'Alger
 8th Road race, UEC European Under-23 Road Championships
 8th Overall Tour d'Algérie
 8th Ronde van Vlaanderen U23
 10th Overall Okolo Jižních Čech
2013
 1st Stage 6 Baltic Chain Tour
 3rd Grand Prix Pino Cerami
 5th Skive–Løbet
 5th Tour of Almaty
2014
 2nd Mayor Cup
 3rd Grand Prix of Moscow
 4th Overall Tour of Estonia
2015
 3rd Road race, National Road Championships
 6th Moscow Cup
 7th Clássica Loulé
 8th Ronde van Noord-Holland
 9th Overall Tour of Borneo
 10th Overall GP Internacional do Guadiana
 10th Overall Tour of Estonia
2016
 2nd Grand Prix Minsk

References

External links

1990 births
Living people
Latvian male cyclists